Farnham is a town in Surrey, England, within the Borough of Waverley.

Farnham may also refer to:

Places

Canada 
 Farnham, Quebec

United Kingdom 
 Farnham, Dorset
 Farnham, Essex
 Farnham, Northumberland, now in Hepple
 Farnham, North Yorkshire
 Farnham, Suffolk
 Farnham, Surrey
 Farnham Castle, Surrey
 Farnham Common, Buckinghamshire
 Farnham Royal, Buckinghamshire

United States 
 Farnham, New York
 Farnham, Virginia
 Farnham Creek, a stream in Minnesota
 Farnham Lake, a lake in Minnesota

People 
Farnham (surname)

Fiction 
 Farnham the Drunk, a character in the popular role playing game Diablo
 Hubert Farnham, the title character in the Robert A. Heinlein novel Farnham's Freehold
 Farnham's Legend, a science fiction novel, based on the X computer game series
 The Farnhams, a family in the British TV soap Brookside

Other 
 Baron Farnham, a title in the peerage of Ireland

See also 
Farnam (disambiguation)
Farnum (disambiguation)